White City is an unincorporated community in Gulf County, Florida, United States. Its geographical coordinates are 29.8840955, -85.2199164.

References

Unincorporated communities in Gulf County, Florida
Unincorporated communities in Florida
Populated places on the Intracoastal Waterway in Florida